The 2018–19 Under 20 Elite League (sometimes referred to as the European Elite League) was an age-restricted association football tournament for national Under-20 teams. It was the second edition of the Under 20 Elite League.

Participating teams

League table

Results

References

Under 20 Elite League
2018–19 in European football